The 2007 Bryant Bulldogs football team represented Bryant University as a member of Northeast-10 Conference (NE-10) during the 2007 NCAA Division II football season. The Bulldogs were led by fourth-year head coach Marty Fine and played their home games at Bulldog Stadium. They finished the season 8–3 overall and 8–1 in NE-10 play.

Schedule

References

Bryant
Bryant Bulldogs football seasons
Bryant Bulldogs football